The Shadow Secretary of State for Work and Pensions is an office within British politics held by a member of His Majesty's Loyal Opposition. The duty of the office holder is to scrutinise the actions of the government's Secretary of State for Work and Pensions and develop alternative policies. The office holder, currently Jonathan Ashworth, is a member of the Shadow Cabinet.

List of Shadow Secretaries

Official Opposition (United Kingdom)